Turan ( or ) is the name of several inhabited localities in Russia:

Turan, Tuva Republic, a town in Piy-Khemsky District
Turan, Republic of Buryatia, a selo in Tunkinsky District
Turan, Nizhny Novgorod Oblast, a selo in Vetluzhsky District
Turan Urban Settlement, a municipal division of Turan Town Under District Jurisdiction in Piy-Khemsky District